Kedar Karki is a Nepalese politician and member of Provincial Assembly. Karki is also the chief whip of the Nepali Congress party in the Provincial Assembly. He is currently serving as Minister for Internal Affairs and Law of Province No. 1.

Electoral history

2017 Nepalese provincial elections

References 

Nepali Congress politicians from Koshi Province
Year of birth missing (living people)
Living people

Provincial cabinet ministers of Nepal
Members of the Provincial Assembly of Koshi Province